Inghem is a former commune in the Pas-de-Calais department in the Hauts-de-France region of France. On 1 September 2016, it was merged into the new commune Bellinghem, of which it became a delegated commune.

Geography
A village situated 6 miles (9 km) south of Saint-Omer, at the D198 and D201 crossroads. A junction with the A26 autoroute is less than a mile away.

Population

Places of interest
 The church of Notre-Dame, dating from the eighteenth century.

See also
Communes of the Pas-de-Calais department

References

Former communes of Pas-de-Calais